ET3 or ET-3 may refer to:

 Electronics Technician (US Navy), Third Class, United States Naval rating
 ET3 (Greece), 3rd channel from Ellinikí Radiofonía Tileórasi (ERT), the Hellenic Broadcasting Corporation
 Earl Thomas (defensive back), an American football free safety for the Seattle Seahawks
 Vespa ET-3, model produced between the 1970s and the mid-1990s
 Evacuated Tube Transport Technologies, a business committed to the implementation of Evacuated Tube Transport (ETT)
 Endothelin 3, a protein, member of endothelin family